A filter graph is used in multimedia processing - for example, to capture video from a webcam. Filters take input, process it (or change the input), and then output the processed data.  For example: a video codec  takes raw uncompressed video and compresses it using a video standard such as H.264.  To compress a multimedia stream a filter graph could have two inputs:
 Audio
 Video
Usually these are expressed as file sources.  The file sources would feed compression filters, the output of the compression filters would feed into a multiplexer that would combine the two inputs and produce a single output.  (An example of a multiplexer would be an MPEG transport stream creator.) Finally the multiplexer output feeds into a file sink, which would create a file from the output.

A filter graph in multimedia processing is a directed graph.  Edges represent one-way data flow and nodes represent a data-processing step. Pins or pads identify the connection points between nodes and edges.

Example of programs that use filter graphs
 GStreamer - Linux based multimedia framework.  In Gstreamer a filter is called an element. Filter graphs can be built with the GStreamer Editor.
 GraphEdit - Microsoft tool for building filter graphs
 GraphStudioNext - an open source tool to build and debug DirectShow filter graphs, replacement for GraphEdit
 DirectShow - Windows based multimedia framework.
 GraphEditPlus - a free tool for building DirectShow filter graphs and generating C++ source code for them.
 Harpia - a graphic interface for learning, implementation and management of vision systems

See also
Explanation of filter graph in DirectShow article: DirectShow#Architecture

External links

DirectShow
 Explanation of filter graph manager 
 Filters what they are
 Example of filter graph usage
 Data Flow in the Filter Graph

Graphics software
Multimedia frameworks